Kamen Rider Hibiki is the 2005 incarnation of the Kamen Rider franchise. It ran for 48 episodes from January 30, 2005 to January 22, 2006.

Episodes

Hibiki